Dragon Fyre is a steel roller coaster located at Canada's Wonderland in Vaughan, Ontario, Canada. It was manufactured in 1980 but opened when the park made its debut in 1981. It operated under the name Dragon Fyre from 1981 to 1997, when it was respelled to Dragon Fire. The name was quietly reverted to the original name in 2019. It was one of the four original coasters at Canada's Wonderland.

The ride is built at the east end of the park in the Medieval Faire section. It is located adjacent to the parking lot, so it is one of the first coasters that is seen. The coaster has a green and yellow track with purple support poles. Since the removal of Drachen Fire from Busch Gardens Williamsburg, Dragon Fyre is also the only Arrow Dynamics coaster in existence to have counterclockwise-turning corkscrews.

Dragon Fyre was designed to operate with three trains, which is made evident by the fact that the ride has a set of safety brakes following the corkscrews and before the helix. However, due to the ride's short duration, it would be very difficult for the ride staff to load a train in the station without having one train stop in the middle of the ride. Because of this, Dragon Fyre never used its third train. In 1987, the third train was modified for use on The Bat.

Ride experience
Out of the station, the track makes a left-hand turn and climbs the  lift hill. This leads directly into a  drop to the ground level. Leveling out, the track has a short straight segment as it passes through back to back vertical loops. After the vertical loops, the track makes a left turn, passing a backstage area, and enters into a counter-clockwise double corkscrew. This is followed by a set of safety brakes, then a clockwise upward helix to end the ride.

Ride elements
Double Loop
Double Corkscrew
Helix Up

References

External links
 Official Dragon Fyre page
 

Roller coasters introduced in 1981
Roller coasters in Ontario
Roller coasters operated by Cedar Fair
1981 establishments in Ontario